The Orphan of Zhao is a Chinese play from the Yuan era, attributed to the 13th-century dramatist Ji Junxiang (紀君祥). The play has as its full name The Great Revenge of the Orphan of Zhao. The play is classified in the zaju genre of dramas. It revolves around the central theme of revenge.

The play is divided in six parts, comprising five acts (折 zhe) and a wedge (楔子 xiezi), which may be an interlude or—as it is in this case—a prologue. It contains both dialogue and songs. The story of The Orphan of Zhao takes place during the Spring and Autumn period. The protagonists are General Han Jue in the first act, the retired Minister Gongsun Chujiu (公孙杵臼) in the second and third act, and the Zhao orphan in the final two acts. The Orphan of Zhao was the first Chinese play to be known in Europe.

Background

Until Ji Junxiang's play in the 13th century, the story appeared in prose form as historical narrative. After Ji's play, stage drama was the main form, with numerous regional operas, some completely independent of his play.

The Records of the Grand Historian, written by the historian Sima Qian from the Han dynasty, contains a chapter surrounding the events of the Zhao family. These records were adapted by Ji Junxiang in The Orphan of Zhao. The play depicts the theme of familial revenge, which is placed in the context of Confucian morality and social hierarchical structure. Though the story highlights social values and norms,  says the many violent scenes serve mostly as theatrical entertainment, only secondarily inciting moral feelings in the audience.  remarked that Cheng Ying's suffering and endurance, as he was forced to live in his enemy's household so he could protect the orphan, could be interpreted as an ironic reflection by the author about the ethno-political circumstances of the Yuan era. The author therefore tried to incorporate Han institutions of Confucian values through his work.

Plot summary

Prologue
Duke Ling was the ruler of the Jin state. In his court, Minister Zhao Dun and General Tu'an Gu were two of his most influential subordinates. However, Tu'an Gu had a deep hatred for Zhao Dun. He wanted to destroy his rival, Zhao Dun, and exterminate the Zhao family. General Tu'an Gu succeeded in framing Zhao Dun, and slaughtered 300 members of the Zhao family. Soon thereafter, a decree was forged in the duke's name to order the death of General Zhao Shuo, the son of Zhao Dun. Zhao Shuo had namely been spared during the massacre as he was married to Lady Zhuang, the daughter of Duke Ling.  When General Zhao Shuo received the forged decree, he commits suicide.

First act
Zhao Shuo and his wife were expecting a child, but the infant was born after the tragic circumstances involving his father's death. Tu'an Gu, intending to get rid of the newborn infant, orders General Han Jue to surround the palace. Lady Zhuang entrusts her newborn child to the physician Cheng Ying, a retainer to the Zhao family. However, she knew—as Cheng Ying had indicated—that she would be pressured to reveal where her child is, thus she took her own life. As the physician Cheng Ying was entrusted to keep the child safe, he attempts to escape with the child hidden in his medicine chest. While Cheng is departing through the palace gates, he is stopped and questioned by Han Jue. Eventually, Han Jue discovered the child, whom Cheng Ying had tried to hide and keep safe. However, troubled by his sense of compassion, he allows Cheng Ying and the infant to escape. Thereafter he commits suicide by taking his sword to his throat, realizing that he will be tortured for what happened to the orphan.

Second act
After these events, Tu'an Gu threatens to kill every infant in Jin if the Zhao orphan is not produced. Cheng Ying, who was fearful, consults the retired Minister Gongsun Chujiu. To prevent this massacre, Cheng Ying decides to sacrifice his own child in desperation so that the safety of the Zhao orphan and every infant in the state was ensured.

Third act
Gongsun Chujiu departs with Cheng's child, whom he presented as the Zhao orphan. In the self-sacrifice, both Gongsun and the child were found and murdered. Cheng Ying silently suffers and weeps for his own child before he parts with him.

Fourth act
Twenty years had passed since the third act. Cheng Ying has taken care of the orphan during his early life. The Zhao orphan, now known as Cheng Bo, has reached maturity. General Tu'an Gu has no child of his own, thus he had adopted the Zhao orphan, unknowingly of his true identity, and named him Tu Cheng. On a fateful day, the orphan is in Cheng Ying's study, where he discovers a scroll depicting all the people involved in the tragic events relating to his early life. Cheng Ying decides the time has come to show the tragedy of the Zhao family and reveal to the orphan the truth of his origins. Various tragic events featuring many loyal friends and retainers, who gave their lives, were depicted on the scroll.

Fifth act
After discovering the truth, the Zhao orphan kills Tu'an Gu in the streets and avenges his family. The orphan, now known as Zhao Wu, is reinstated with his family titles and properties.

Translations and adaptations
The Orphan of Zhao was the first Chinese play to be translated into any European language. The Jesuit father Joseph Henri Marie de Prémare translated the play, which he titled L'Orphelin de la Maison de Tchao, into French in 1731. In Premaré's work, the dialogue was translated, but not the songs. The story caught the imagination of European minds at a time when chinoiserie was in vogue and this translation was the basis for adaptations over the next few decades.

Premaré sent the translation to be delivered to Étienne Fourmont, a member of the French Academy. However, Jean Baptiste Du Halde instead took possession and published it in his Description Géographique, Historique, Chronologique, Politique et Physique de l'Empire de la Chine et de la Tartarie Chinois in 1735, although he had no permission from Prémare or Fourmont to do so. Whatever the circumstances, Du Halde published the first European translation of a genuine Chinese play. Prémare's translation would soon be translated into English for two distinct English editions of Du Halde's book, which appeared in 1736 and 1741 respectively. The first one was translated was by Richard Brookes in 1736, and the second one was translated by Green and Guthrie in 1738–41. In 1762, a third English translation of Prémare's work was done by Thomas Percy, which was a revision of Green and Guthrie. However, many of Prémare's mistranslations remained, as did the omission of the songs. In his book, Du  remarked: "There are Plays the Songs of which are difficult to be understood, because they are full of Allusions to things unknown to us, and Figures of Speech very difficult for us to observe." Nevertheless, The Orphan of Zhao was well-received throughout Europe with the vogue of chinoiserie at its height. Between 1741 and 1759, the play was adapted into French, English, and Italian.

In 1741, William Hatchett wrote and published the earliest adaptation of the play, which was in English; it was titled The Chinese Orphan: An Historical Tragedy. However, in essence, it was written as a political attack to Sir Robert Walpole, who was likened to Tu'an Gu, renamed as Saiko in Hattchett's play. Thus, Hatchett's work was never produced and—in the words of John Genest—"totally unfit for representation." In his work, Hatchett made a dedication to the Duke of Argyle in the context of the play, where the characters could be recognized as the people whom he satirized:
"As the Chinese are a wise discerning People, and much fam'd for their Art in Government, it is not to be wonder'd at, that the Fable is political: Indeed, it exhibits an amazing Series of Male-administration, which the Chinese Author has wrought up to the highest Pitch of Abhorrence, as if he had been acquainted with the Inflexibility of your Grace's Character in that respect. It's certain, he has exaggerated Nature, and introduced rather a Monster than a Man; but perhaps it is a Maxim with the Chinese Poets to represent Prime Ministers as so many Devils, to deter honest People from being deluded by them."

In Vienna, the Italian playwright Pietro Metastasio had received a request from Empress Maria Theresa to write a drama for a court performance. Thus, in 1752, he produced L'Eroe cinese. For the play, he had taken inspiration of The Orphan of Zhao and specifically mentions the story in Du Halde's book. However, as Metastasio was restricted by the number of actors (namely five) and duration, his play had a rather simple plot.

In 1753, Voltaire wrote his L'Orphelin de la Chine. About his adapted play, Voltaire's thesis was that of a story exemplifying morality, that is as he explained, that genius and reason has a natural superiority over blind force and barbarism. Voltaire praised the Confucian morality of The Orphan of Zhao, remarking that it was a "valuable monument of antiquity, and gives us more insight into the manners of China than all the histories which ever were, or ever will be written of that vast empire". However, the play was still considered problematic by him as it violated the conventions of the unities of time, action, and place, likening it to some of Shakespeare and Lope de Vega's "monstrous farces" as "nothing but a heap of incredible stories". Although the story of the orphan is retained  in Voltaire's play, he is placed in the setting of invading Tartars. The orphan, who was the royal heir, is entrusted to the official Zamti by the Chinese monarch. Voltaire introduces the theme of love (which is absent in the original play), where Genghis Khan has a secret passion for Idamé, the wife of Zamti, but he is rejected by her as she stands firm to the lawful conduct of her nation. Voltaire had altered the story to fit his idea of European enlightenment and Chinese civilization, whereas the original play was contrasted as a stark and relentless story of intrigue, murder, and revenge. In August 1755 at the Comédie Français in Paris, L'Orphelin de la Chine was for the first time performed on stage. The adaptation was well-received amongst contemporaries.

In 1756, the Irish playwright Arthur Murphy wrote his The Orphan of China. He stated that he had been attracted by Premare's play, but his play even more resembles Voltaire's L'Orphelin de la Chine. Murphy's Orphan of China was first performed in April 1759 and became highly successful in England. In his 1759 edition, Murphy criticized Voltaire for adding a theme of love—which he thought was unsuitable in this play—and for having a "scantiness of interesting business". He also reasserted the story of revenge, which was omitted in Voltaire's play. In Murphy's adaptation, the virtuous people killed the leader of the Tartars. Although different, his play approached the original Chinese play closer than any other European adaption of the time. The Orphan of China was well received in the literary circles of London. In 1767, Murphy's play was brought to the United States, where it was first performed at the Southwark Theater in Philadelphia.

In 1834, Stanislas Julien made the first complete translation of The Orphan of Zhao, which was from the Chinese original into French, including both the dialogue and the songs.

The 2010 film Sacrifice directed by Chen Kaige is based on the historical Chinese play.

In 2012 James Fenton adapted The Orphan of Zhao for the Royal Shakespeare Company production, directed by Gregory Doran in the Swan Theatre, Stratford-upon-Avon. Fenton wrote four additional songs for the play.

See also
The Chalk Circle
 Showtunes (Stephin Merritt and Chen Shi-zheng album), which includes music from an adaptation of Orphan of Zhao

References

Bibliography

Further reading
 W. L. Idema, "The Orphan of Zhao: Self-Sacrifice, Tragic Choice and Revenge and the Confucianization of Mongol Drama at the Ming Court," Cina.21  (1988):  159–190.  JSTOR

Translations
 L'orphelin De La Maison De Tchao, Tragédie Chinoise, Traduite En François Par Le R. P. De Prémare, De La Compagnie De Jésus, En 1731. Manuscript Online
 Tchao chi cou ell: Or, the little Orphan of the Family of Tchao, A Chinese Tragedy in J. B. Du Halde, The General History of China (London: John Watts,  2nd ed. 1739).
 Fenzo Modesto Bianchi Francesco, tr. L'orfano Cinese : Dramma Per Musica Da Rappresentarsi Nel Nobilissimo Teatro De S. Benedetto, Il Carnovale Dell'anno Mdcclxxxvii. (Venezia: appresso Modesto Fenzo,  1787).
 Liu Jung-en, tr., in Six Yüan Plays (Penguin Books, 1972 )
 Wang Pi-twan H., tr,. "The Revenge of the Orphan of Chao, by Chi Chun-hsiang," Renditions 9 (1978): 103–131.
 Zhao You, tr., in Snow in Midsummer: Tragic Stories from Ancient China. (Beijing: Foreign Languages Press,  2001).  . . Includes "The Orphan of the Zhao Family."

 
Yuan dynasty plays
13th century in China
Jin (Chinese state)
13th-century plays
Chinese plays adapted into films
Plays set in the 6th century BC